The 1991 Westchester Cup was a women's tennis tournament played on outdoor hard courts at the Manhattanville College in Westchester, New York in the United States. It was the 7th edition of the event, the second played in Westchester, and was part of the Tier V series of the 1991 WTA Tour. The tournament was played from July 22 through July 28, 1991. Unseeded Isabelle Demongeot won the singles title and earned $18,000 first-prize money.

Finals

Singles
 Isabelle Demongeot defeated  Lori McNeil 6–4, 6–4

Doubles
 Rosalyn Fairbank /  Lise Gregory defeated  Katrina Adams /  Lori McNeil 7–5, 6–4

External links
 ITF tournament edition draws
 Tournament draws

Westchester Cup
Westchester Cup
Westchester Cup
Tennis tournaments in New York (state)